Pareuptychia hesionides, the hesionides satyr, is a species of butterfly of the family Nymphalidae. It is found in South America.

Subspecies
Pareuptychia hesionides hesionides (Bolivia, Brazil: Minas Gerais)
Pareuptychia hesionides deviae Brévignon, 2005 (French Guiana)

References

Butterflies described in 1964
Euptychiina
Lepidoptera of French Guiana
Fauna of Brazil
Nymphalidae of South America